Caml Lights may refer to:

 Camel Lights, a brand of cigarette. See Camel (cigarette).
 Caml Light, a functional programming language.